Darryl Roy George (born 14 March 1993) is an Australian professional baseball player for the Melbourne Aces of the Australian Baseball League. He previously played for the Orix Buffaloes of the Nippon Professional Baseball (NPB).

Career
On 28 November 2016, he signed with Orix Buffaloes of the Nippon Professional Baseball (NPB).

On 31 October 2017,  he became a free agent.

International career
George was a member of the Australia national baseball team in the 2016 Haarlem Baseball Week, 2018 exhibition series against Japan, 2019 Canberra camp, 2019 WBSC Premier12, and 2023 World Baseball Classic.

References

External links

Darryl George stats MiLB.com
Darryl George stats  ABL.com

1993 births
Living people
Australian expatriate baseball players in Japan
Australian expatriate baseball players in the United States
Bowling Green Hot Rods players
Gulf Coast Rays players
Hudson Valley Renegades players
Melbourne Aces players
Nippon Professional Baseball second basemen
Nippon Professional Baseball shortstops
Nippon Professional Baseball third basemen
Orix Buffaloes players
Princeton Rays players
Sportspeople from Melbourne
People from Carlton, Victoria
2023 World Baseball Classic players